Al Forat Network is a satellite television network in Iraq.  The Arabic language network is owned by Ammar al-Hakim, an Iraqi Shi'a cleric and politician. Al-Forat has 300 employees, with offices located in the city of Karrada in Baghdad.

References

External links

Arabic-language television stations
International broadcasters
Television stations in Iraq
Mass media in Baghdad
Television channels and stations established in 2004